Sin Ti (English: Without You) is the twelfth studio album by Dominican singer Antony Santos.

Track listing

Charts

References 

2003 albums
Antony Santos albums
Latin music albums
Spanish-language albums